It's-It, released in October 1992, is a remix album by the Icelandic alternative rock band the Sugarcubes. After its release, the Sugarcubes disbanded and lead singer Björk went on to have a successful solo career. One single that was released from this compilation, the Tony Humphries remix of "Leash Called Love" reached number one on Billboard's Hot Dance Club Songs Chart in 1992.

A limited edition double-disc set was released in Britain but is now long out of print.

Track listing

References

The Sugarcubes albums
1992 remix albums
Elektra Records remix albums